An emendation is an alteration to a term, for a specific technical reason:

 Emendation (textual), altering a word to make sense, e.g. when incomplete or assumed to have been copied incorrectly
 Emendation (zoology), altering the spelling of the name of a taxon to comply with the rules
 In bacteriological taxonomy, altering a name for circumscription of a taxon